The 2014–15 Nicholls State Colonels women's basketball team represented Nicholls State University during the 2014–15 NCAA Division I women's basketball season. The Colonels, led by seventh year head coach DoBee Plaisance, played their home games at Stopher Gym and are members of the Southland Conference.  The team's overall record was 17–13 including one game as the #3 seed in the 2015 Southland Conference women's basketball tournament.  In conference play, the Colonels had a 13–5 record third place.

Roster

Schedule

|-
!colspan=9 style="background:#FF0000; color:#808080;"|  Out of Conference Schedule

|-
!colspan=9 style="background:#FF0000; color:#808080;"|  Southland Conference Schedule

|-
!colspan=9 style="background:#FF0000; color:#808080;"|  Southland Conference tournament

Source

See also
2014–15 Nicholls State Colonels men's basketball team

References

Nicholls Colonels women's basketball seasons
Nicholls State
Nicholls
Nicholls